Clint Chapman (born March 6, 1989) is an American professional basketball player currently playing for Al-Hilal. Has won multiple international basketball accolades in several countries worldwide. Has competed in more than 400 international basketball games. Played in over a dozen countries worldwide from Europe to Asia. Has scored over 6,000 points and collected over 3,000 rebounds.

Career statistics 

|-
| align="left" | NBL 2014–15
| align="left" | Hiroshima D
| 54 || 31 || 22.3|| .425 || .333 || .800 || 7.3 || 0.8 || 0.9 || 1.2 || 1.9 || 15.20
|-
| align="left" | NBL 2015–16
| align="left" | Chiba
| 57 || 40 || 22.4|| .498 || .331 || .777 || 7.79 || 0.8 || 0.8 || 1.2 || 2.1 || 16.90
|-
| align="left" | B League 2016–17
| align="left" | Niigata
| 60 || 36 || 24.2|| .449 || .401 || .718 || 8.25 || 0.9 || 0.5 || 1.7 || 1.9 || 18.92
|-
| align="left" | EuroCup 2018–19
| align="left" | Alba Berlin
| 8 || 8 || 17.5 || .526 || .167 || .950 || 4.75 || 0.88 || .25 || 1.2 || 1.0 || 10.00
|-
| align="left" | EasyCredit BBL 2018–19
| align="left" | Alba Berlin
| 8 || 7 || 15.8 || .571 || .444 || .875 || 4.50 || 0.50 || .25 || 0.5 || 1.3 || 9.380
|-
| align="left" | EasyCredit BBL 2019
| align="left" | Rasta Vechta
| 13 || 8 || 13.7 || .620 || .429 || .744 || 3.00 || 0.69 || .31 || .23 || 1.1 || 11.92
|-

References

1989 births
Living people
Alba Berlin players
American expatriate basketball people in Germany
American expatriate basketball people in Japan
American expatriate basketball people in Switzerland
American expatriate basketball people in Turkey
American men's basketball players
Basketball players from Oregon
Chiba Jets Funabashi players
Fribourg Olympic players
Hiroshima Dragonflies players
Niigata Albirex BB players
Riesen Ludwigsburg players